Ceylon, competed at the 1952 Summer Olympics in Helsinki, Finland.

Athletics

High jump
Nagalingam Ethirveerasingam
Preliminary Round

Boxing

 Leslie Handunge
 Basil Henricus

Diving

Men's 3m Springboard
 Allan Smith
 Preliminary Round — 55.00 points (→ 31st place)

Swimming

 Geoffrey Marks

References
 Official Olympic Reports
 Sri Lanka at the 1952 Helsinki Summer Games

Nations at the 1952 Summer Olympics
1952
1952 in Ceylon